{{safesubst:#invoke:RfD|||month = March
|day = 13
|year = 2023
|time = 22:00
|timestamp = 20230313220047

|content=
REDIRECT Traditional Chinese timekeeping

}}